This is a round-up of the 1963 Sligo Senior Football Championship. Ballisodare, having linked up with neighbours St. Patrick's, claimed a fourth successive title in 1963, following a replay win over Craobh Rua in the final.

First round

Quarter-finals

Semi-finals

Sligo Senior Football Championship Final

Sligo Senior Football Championship Final Replay

References

 Sligo Champion (Summer-Autumn 1963)

Sligo Senior Football Championship
Sligo